Hutton Junction railway station served the town of Guisborough, in the historical county of North Riding of Yorkshire, England, from 1878 to 1891 on the Middlesbrough and Guisborough Railway.

History 
The station was opened on 1 November 1878 by the North Eastern Railway. It was reduced to one train a day in July 1885. Trains had to reverse from here to get to Guisborough. The station closed in April 1891.

References 

Disused railway stations in North Yorkshire
Former North Eastern Railway (UK) stations
Railway stations in Great Britain opened in 1878
Railway stations in Great Britain closed in 1891
1878 establishments in England
1891 disestablishments in England